Korntal-Münchingen is a town in the district of Ludwigsburg, Baden-Württemberg, Germany. It is situated at the northwestern border of Stuttgart and 8 km of its centre, and 10 km southwest of Ludwigsburg.  Korntal was begun in the 19th Century when King Wilhelm of Württemberg permitted a group of Württemberg Pietists to erect a settlement based on the settlement congregations of the Herrnhuter Bruedergemeine or Moravian Church.

Geography

Location

Korntal-Münchingen is in the Strohgäu, at elevations between 285 and 405 meters.  It lies directly on the northwestern border of Stuttgart.

Constituent communities

Korntal-Münchingen was created from the forced merger of the city Korntal and the community Münchingen.  It is divided into three districts: Korntal, Münchingen, and Kallenberg.  The official designation of the districts is Korntal-Münchingen, area Korntal; Korntal-Münchingen, area Münchingen; Korntal-Münchingen, area Kallenberg.
Area Korntal consists of the former city of Korntal, and area Münchingen consists of the bigger part of the former village of Münchingen, including Müllerheim, the mill "Glemsmühle" at the Glems stream and the estate "Hof Mauer". It also comprises the former settlements of "Birkach", "Leinfelden" [and Rugelberc] [?? never heart of that one!], settlements that had been abandoned by the Early Modern era. Area Kallenberg consists of that part of the area of the former village of Münchingen that lies East of motorway A 81 and North of B 10, and developed around an industrial area since the 1950s.

History

The present city was founded on 1 January 1975, in the course of district reform in Baden-Württemberg, when the city of Korntal and the community of Münchingen were combined - against the declared will of most of the citizens of Münchingen, to say the least.

Korntal

The district Korntal was first documented in 1297 in the records of Sindelfingen.  Korntal was an estate until 1819.  In 1819 the town of Korntal was founded as a civic-religious community on the model of the communities established in Germany by the Moravian Church.  In connection with the construction of the Great Hall of Württemberg, William I of Württemberg granted certain special rights to the community.  These were lost in 1919 with the Weimar constitution; at this time the community was no longer connected to the Moravian Church.  In 1868, Korntal station was opened on the Black Forest Railway between Zuffenhausen and Calw.  On 30 June 1958, the community of Korntal gained the status of a city.

Münchingen
Münchingen was first documented in 1130 in the "Zwiefalter Chronicle", and was ceded in 1336 by the sons of Ulrich von Asperg to Count Ulrich of Württemberg.  St. Catharine's Hospital was built in 1278 and a mill was built in 1381.  In 1558 the "old" Münchinger Castle was built; the "new" castle was built in 1735.  During the Thirty Years' War, a large part of the village was destroyed.  The first courthouse was built in 1599 and was rebuilt in 1687.  The St. John's Lutheran Church was newly built from 1645 to 1650.  A new school was built in 1645, and then rebuilt in 1743-1744.  In 1906, Münchingen received a rail connection (Strohgäubahn), a single-track regional train from Feuerbach to Weissach.

Mayor
The mayor is Joachim Wolf. He was elected in 2007 and reelected in 2015. His predecessor was Peter Stritzelberger.

Education 
The  is located in Korntal-Münchingen.

Sons and daughters of the town

 Johann Georg Gmelin (1674-1728), pharmacist and chemist
 Irmela Hijiya-Kirschnereit (born 1948), Japanologist

Personalities who have worked on the ground 

 Johann Ludwig Krapf (1810-1881), pietistic missionary, explorer, linguistic and African explorer.
 Martin Winterkorn (born 1947), Chairman of the Board of Management of Volkswagen AG, grew up in Münchingen

International relations

Korntal-Münchingen is twinned with:
 : Mirande (Gers)
 : Tubize (Walloon Brabant)

References

Ludwigsburg (district)
Württemberg